Taipei Heping Basketball Gymnasium is an indoor arena in the Daan District, Taipei City. The building is the home venue for the Taipei Fubon Braves of the P. LEAGUE+ (PLG) and ASEAN Basketball League. Taipei Heping Basketball Gymnasium opened on June 8, 2017, and seats 6,958 fans for Braves games.

Opening 
The arena had its grand opening on June 8, 2017. The first game at the Taipei Heping Basketball Gymnasium took place on July 15, 2017, as the 2017 William Jones Cup. The Braves played their first regular season game there with a 92–71 win against the Kinmen Kaoliang Liquor on December 3, 2017.

Accessibility

Transportation 
Traffic congestion after events can cause delays for those who choose to drive to Taipei Heping Basketball Gymnasium. Visitors are encouraged to take Taipei Metro, the nearest station is Technology Building station.

Parking on-site 
Taipei Heping Basketball Gymnasium features 537 parking spaces during Braves games (190 for vehicles, 347 for motorcycle).

See also 
 Taipei Fubon Braves
 TaiwanBeer HeroBears
 Taoyuan Leopards

Reference

External links 
 

Sports venues completed in 2017
Basketball venues in Taiwan
Badminton venues